G. cruciata may refer to:
 Gentiana cruciata, the star gentian or cross gentian, a flowering plant species
 Galium cruciata, a synonym for Cruciata laevipes, a plant species

See also 
 Cruciata (disambiguation)